James Sandford may refer to:

James Sandford (translator), English author and translator
James T. Sandford, American politician
James Sandford (rugby union) (born 1989), Irish rugby player
James Sandford (TV personality), from Made in Chelsea
James Wallace Sandford (1879–1958), businessman and politician in South Australia

See also
James Sanford (disambiguation)